Nandlal Nayak is a folk artist, music composer and a film director. He was music director of national award winner feature film Amu(2005). He promotes folk music  among Indian Youth and rest of the world. He is a member of Sangeet Natak Akademi.

Life

Early life and family
Nandlal Nayak is born in the lineage of traditional folk artist family in his ancestral village of Bokba in 1973 and grew up Ranchi. He is the son of Padmashri Mukund Nayak. He grew up surrounded by the rhythms, melodies and folklore of Jharkhand. He completed his graduation from Gossner College, Ranchi. He married  American dancer Wendy Jehlen in 1997.

Career
In 1990s, he was a modern nagpuri solo singer. After marriage with American dancer Wendy Jehlen (Bharatnatyam, Odisi and modern) in 1997, he moved to Boston, United States. He resided in Italy two years for Benetton's Farica Musica project. Then he worked in fusion CDs in Italy but due copy right of Benetton, he took his tracks and left. After returning Ranchi, he produced a nagpuri movie based on human trafficking but it was never released due to financial issue.
As a Ford Scholar Nandlal Nayak travelled across globe, not only to spread the fragrance of folk music of Jharkhand to the world, but also to collaborate with the musicians and film-makers from USA, Japan, Ghana, Germany, Italy, Austria, Great Britain etc. Films and music of Nandlal showcases his global exposure, yet grounded in his folk tradition. Nayak has been an ambassador of Jharkhandi music, dance, film and culture for over a decade.

He was music director of national award winner feature film Amu(2005). He composed music of Nagpuri film Chhoti which was based on human trafficking in 2009. He was music director of nagpuri film Phulmania which premiered at Jharkhand International Film Festival Awards (JIFFA) 2019 and the 72nd Cannes Film Festival in France.
Directed by Nandlal, feature film Dhumkkudiya showcases the issue of Human Trafficking of tribal youths from Jharkhand, in the name of domestic help.

Filmography

Awards
Creative Award from the National Endowment for the Arts, USA, 2005.
Senior Performing Artist Fellowship Award from the American Institute of Indian Studies, 2004.
Creative Artist Award form the Japan-US friendship Commission/National Endowment for the arts, 2003.
Award and Citation from the Massachusetts Legislature for contribution to the cultural life of Massachusetts, 1996.
INDROADS award from the Institute for International Education/Ford Foundation, 1996.
Selected Awards for Amu: FIPRESCI Critics Award, January, 2005.
Jury Award, Torino, Italy (Cine Donne Film Festival) October, 2005.
Best Producers, February Award, Hollywood Blood Horror Festival (2020)
Best Director, American Golden Picture International Film Festival, USA (2020)
Best Director, Mabig Film Festival, Augsburg, Germany (2020)

References

External links 
 

Living people
People from Ranchi district
People from Ranchi
Nagpuria people
1973 births